Kim Eana (born April 27, 1979) is a South Korean lyricist. She is best known for writing the lyrics to hit K-pop songs, including "Abracadabra" performed by Brown Eyed Girls, and "Good Day" performed by IU. She has been active since 2003.

Career
Kim is a songwriter who has written numerous number-one songs on the Korean pop music charts. She has collaborated with Lee Min-soo and has written lyrics for 24K, Son Dam-bi, Shinee, Brown Eyed Girls, IU, VIXX, Exo-CBX, Younha and Sunny Hill.

Kim is a lyricist, and has also participated in the promotional and music video aspects of the careers of the artists she has worked with.

Since 2015, she has hosted Two Yoo Project Sugar Man, a variety show focused on song production. From 2017 to 2018, she also served as a panelist for reality show Heart Signal.

Style
Kim's work often straddles the line between typical love songs found in popular music and broader tones of social critique or commentary on the entertainment industry. There have been instances when she has offered possible interpretations to her works through social media websites. She said in an interview that her inspirations to write songs are Tablo (from Epik High) and G-Dragon (from Big Bang).

Philanthropy 
On March 8, 2022, Kim donated  million to the Hope Bridge Disaster Relief Association to help those affected by the massive wildfires that started in Uljin, Gyeongbuk, and also spread to Samcheok, Gangwon.

Songwriting credits

Broadcasting

Television

Radio

Web shows

Books
 Kim, Eana (2015). 김이나의 작사법 [Kim Eana's Songwriting Method] (in Korean). Munhakdongne Publishing Group. .

Awards

References

External links
 

1979 births
Mystic Entertainment artists
Living people
Kakao M people
South Korean lyricists
Melon Music Award winners